Kristel Philemon Charlotte Verbeke (born 10 December 1975 in Hamme) is a Flemish singer, actress, host and one of the first members of the girl group K3. After leaving K3 in 2015, she became the group's manager, remaining in this position until 2017. Since leaving K3, Verbeke focused on TV producing and acting.

Life and career

Early life
When Verbeke was 13 her parents divorced. She lived with her father, but kept in touch with her mother. Her two sisters died in their youth. Her younger sister Véronique died at home at age 11 due to carbon monoxide poisoning and her older sister Isabelle died in a car accident at age 21. Her father died of lung cancer at the beginning of the K3 breakthrough. After completing secondary education, she trained as a regent for Dutch, history and economics.

Before meeting the other two K3 members Karen Damen and Kathleen Aerts in 1998, she worked as a bank clerk in Laarne and performed in an homage to Ann Christy together with Robert Mosuse, Andrea Croonenberghs and Pascale Michiels. She also sang as a backing vocalist of Niels William, who later became the discoverer and very first manager of K3.

K3
William introduced Verbeke to Damen and Aerts, and suggested they participate in the 1999 Eurovision Song Contest. They then entered the preselections with the song "Heyah Mama". The intention was to  make the group the Flemish version of the British all-female group "Spice Girls". Thus, K3 was composed of all females in their twenties, and like the Spice Girls, women in their twenties where originally the target audience. This is noticeable in their early lyrics including their first single, "Wat ik wil" (What I want), whose release was not very successful. Eventually, the group achieved great success with adults, but especially with children.

K3 achieved success after the release of "Heyah Mama", and in 2002 William sold the band to Studio 100. The production company made them an even bigger success, with merchandising, film, TV series and books also being released. Aerts left the band in 2009, while Verbeke and Damen kept on. On 27, 28 and 29 May 2011, Verbeke, with K3, was a guest at De Toppers in the Johan Cruyff Arena (then known as Amsterdam ArenA). Verbeke and Damen participated to a talent show airing on VTM. Thereafter they made Josje Huisman join the band. Later it was announced that also Verbeke and Damen would leave the band. After K3's label announced that they would look for new members in late 2015, Verbeke herself helped to choose her successor in a televised competition to determine the new K3. The competition started airing in the Netherlands and Belgium in August 2015. Klaasje Meijer, Hanne Verbruggen and Marthe De Pillecyn were designated as the new K3.

Verbeke was then appointed the new manager of K3 by Studio 100. After two years in this position, in June 2017 she announced that she was stepping down as manager of K3 to make more time for her family and focus on other projects.

Post K3
After leaving K3, Verbeke emerged as a TV producer and theater actress. In 2016 she presented Generation K for Ketnet, an educational program broadcast by VRT. In the spring of 2021 she rejoined Sven De Ridder in the theater comedy Proper Lakens, while starting to record the second season of Zorgen voor mama, the first season of which was nominated for the Prix d'Europe in the best documentary category.

Personal life 
She married singer Gene Thomas and has two daughters, Lily and Nanou.

Discography 

Studio albums
1999: Parels
2000: Alle Kleuren
2001: Tele Romeo
2002: Verliefd
2003: Oya Lele
2004: De Wereld Rond
2005: Kuma He
2006: Ya Ya Yipee
2007: Kusjes
2009: MaMaSé!
2011: Alice in Wonderland
2011: Eyo!
2012: Engeltjes
2013: Loko le

Filmography

References

External links 
 Official site K3 (Dutch)
 

1975 births
Living people
People from Hamme
K3 (band) members
21st-century Belgian women singers
21st-century Belgian singers